The 3rd Dental Battalion is a unit of the United States Navy that supports United States Marine Corps forces on Okinawa, Japan.  The battalion includes nine dental clinics, approximately 77 Dental Officers, 4 Medical Service Corps officers, 181 Dental Technicians, and 26 civilians.  The unit is based out of Camp Foster and falls under the command of the 3rd Marine Logistics Group and the III Marine Expeditionary Force.

Mission
Ensure dental readiness and optimize dental health for all beneficiaries while supporting operational and humanitarian mission.

Subordinate units
 Headquarters and Services Company
 3rd Dental Company
 11th Dental Company
 21st Dental Company
 U.S. Naval Dental Center.

History

The 3rd Dental Battalion was activated on November 1, 1979, at Camp Kinser, Okinawa, Japan and assigned to the 3rd Force Service Support Group, Fleet Marine Forces, Pacific. 3rd Dental Company and 11th Dental Company were activated in 1955. Both companies served in the Republic of Vietnam from June 1965 to November 1969 and were awarded the Presidential Unit Citation, the National Defense Service Medal, Vietnam Service Medal and the Vietnam Cross of Gallantry with palm. 3rd Dental Battalion headquarters relocated from Camp Kinser to Camp Foster in April 1992.

See also

List of United States Marine Corps battalions
Organization of the United States Marine Corps

External links
 3rd Dental Battalion's official website
 3rd Dental Battalion on the Marines website

Medical battalions of the United States Marine Corps
Naval dentistry